A list of films produced in Tibetan.

2010 XUNHUA TIBETAN FOLK CULTURE: THE VIDEO COLLECTION
https://archive.org/details/XunhuaTibetanFolkCultureTheVideoCollection2010